Silver Valley is an unincorporated community in northern Alberta within Saddle Hills County, located  north of Highway 43,  northwest of Grande Prairie.  The area was first opened for homesteaders in 1952.

References

Localities in Saddle Hills County